The 12217 / 12218 Kerala Sampark Kranti Express is a Superfast service among Sampark Kranti category that runs between Kochuveli railway station in Thiruvananthapuram, the capital city of the state of Kerala and Chandigarh the capital city of Haryana & Punjab. It is the longest-running Sampark Kranti train which covers almost 3417 km in one way run. It is running with an LHB rake W.E.F. 8 February 2019.

Route and halts

Timings

From 7 July 2021 it runs with new timings in both the directions. Accordingly, 12217 Kochuveli–Chandigarh Kerala Sampark Kranti Superfast Express departs Kochuveli on every Saturday & Monday at 09.15 hrs and reaches Chandigarh at 09:50 hrs on every Monday & Wednesday. During monsoon periods it leaves Kochuveli at 04.40 hrs on every Saturday & Monday and reaches Chandigarh at 09.50 hrs on every Monday & Wednesday.

In the return direction 12218 Chandigarh–Kochuveli Kerala Sampark Kranti Superfast Express departs Chandigarh on every Wednesday & Friday at 09:20 at reaches Kochuveli at 12:25 on every Friday & Sunday. During Monsoon Timings it departs Chandigarh at 09.20 hrs on every Wednesdays & Fridays and reaches Kochuveli at 14.30 hrs on every Friday & Sunday.

During monsoon periods in Konkan route, timings will be changed.

Coach composition

12217/18 Kochuveli–Chandigarh–Kochuveli Kerala Sampark Kranti Superfast Express has modern LHB coach. It has 22 LHB coach.

 1 AC First Cum AC Two Tier
 2 AC Two Tier
 6 AC Three Tier
 1 Pantry Car
 6 Sleeper class
 4 General Unreserved
 2 End-on Generator coaches (EOG)

Traction

As the route is fully electrified both trains are hauled by a Vadodara Electric Loco Shed-based WAP-7 / WAP-5 locomotive from end to end.

Earlier, this train used to run with a GOC WDP-3A from KCVL to BRC.

See also
Sampark Kranti Express

References

Sampark Kranti Express trains
Transport in Thiruvananthapuram
Rail transport in Chandigarh
Rail transport in Kerala
Rail transport in Karnataka
Rail transport in Goa
Rail transport in Maharashtra
Rail transport in Gujarat
Rail transport in Rajasthan
Rail transport in Delhi
Rail transport in Haryana
Railway services introduced in 2005
Rail transport in Punjab, India
Rail transport in Uttar Pradesh
Rail transport in Madhya Pradesh